Ekaterini "Katia" Dandoulaki (born May 16, 1948) is a Greek theatre, television and film actress. She is best known for her role as protagonist Virna Drakou on the Greek television series Lampsi in the 1990s.
Katia also starred in the series I Zoi tis Allis, which surpassed 70% of the ratings and in Vals me 12 Theous in 2012 with at least 60% ratings on the Ant1 network. It was the 2012 record for the network.

Biography
She was the spouse of the Greek intellectual, translator, writer Marios Ploritis, who translated many of her plays, until his death in 2006.

Dandoulaki studied English at Boston University for one year (1968) and speaks English fluently.

Career
Katia Dandoulaki starred in many popular Greek films, like Papaflessas (1971) with Dimitris Papamichail. She played the role of  Marmo Panteou, a young wife, in the classic TV series "Oi Pantheoi" (1977), based on a classic novel by Tassos Athanassiadis.  During the 90s she starred as Virna Drakou in the popular Greek soap opera of Nikos Foskolos Lampsi.

She also played Maria Callas in Terence MacNally's Master Class, and Blanche in A Streetcar Named Desire. She was one of the lead stars in the TV series, "Istera irthan oi melisses" (2000), directed by Yiannis Koutsomitis. It was one of the few successes that ET1, the state TV channel, had during that period. During the 2001-2002 season she played Emma in the classic Pinter play 'Betrayal'. It was a big success, and directed by Stamatis Fasoulis. Her co-stars were S. Zalmas and K. Konstantopoulos.

Subsequently, she worked on Vera Sto Dexi, as a main character, until 2007.

After Vera Sto Dexi, a TV series from MEGA CHANNEL, she worked on the tv series I Zoi Tis Allis as main character airing at the same channel.

In 2019 she has started acting in "Agries Melisses" a dramatic TV series from ANTENNA CHANNEL.

Katia Dandoulaki Theatre
Katia Dandoulaki has a theatre named after her in Athens. The modern theatre of Katia Dandoulaki resulted from the remodelling of the third floor of a commercial complex of entertainment halls built in the 1960s. In particular, the 1000 m2 area of the Superstar Theatre was completely remodelled. It is a work by architect Katerina Thanou.

The theatre proper has 500 stalls on an inclined level and a stage 200 m2 with a revolving section which offered the possibility of multiple uses. The foyer, with an area of 250 m2, is on two levels and includes a bar, bookshop, lounge and a small exhibition area in the loft.

Theatrical filmography

1966–1979
 Madame sans-gene/ Victorien Sardou
 Irkutsk story/ Alexei Arbuzov
 The little foxes/ Lillian Helman
 Un Amour fou/ Andre Roussin
 I want to see Musov/ Marty Feldman
 Panoria/ George Hortatsis
 Life is a dream/ Pedro Calderon de la Barca
 Miss Julie/ August Strindberg
 The school for wives/ Jean Molière
 Poor Marik/ Alexei Arbuzov
 Private Lives/ Noël Coward
 Ring round the moon/ Jean Anouilh

1979–1985
 Anna Karenina/ Leo Tolstoy
 Arms and the man/ George Bernard Shaw
 It had to be you/ Renee Taylor & Josheph Bologna
 Ciao
 The heiress/ Ruth & August Goetz
 Extrimities/ William Mastrosimone
 As you desire me/ Luigi Pirandello
 Anatol/ Arthur Snitchler
 Dream girl/ Elmer Rice
 To clothe the naked/ Luigi Pirandello
 Nan (Henceforward)/ Alan Ayckbourn
 Bell, book and candle/ John Van Druten
 The day after the fair/ Thomas Hardy (based on the novel "on the western circuit")
 The seagull/ Anton Chekhov (1993)
 Jordan / Anna Reynolds & Moira Buffini (1993)
 Creditors/ August Strindberg (1994)

1995–present
 The Cherry Orchard/ Anton Chekhov (1995–1996)
 A servant of two masters/ Carlo Goldoni (1996–1997)
 Master Class/ Terrence McNally (1997–1998)
 A streetcar named desire/ Tennessee Williams (1998–1999)
 Sause for the Goose/ Georges Feydeau (1999–2000)
 Jordan/ Anna Reynolds & Moira Buffini (2000)
 It had to be you/ Renee Taylor & Josheph Bologna (2000–2001)
 Betrayal/ Harold Pinter (2001–02)
 Chapter Two/ Neil Simon (2002–2003)
 I'm staying near the restaurant: Late to get married, early to die/ Edvard Radzinski (2003–2004)
Three Sisters/ Anton Chekhov (2004–2005)
Witness for the prosecution/ (2005–2006)

National Theatre of Greece Productions
A month in the country / Ivan Turgenev (1984)
Lysistrata/ Aristophanes (summer 1997)

Television and film work
"Agries Melisses" (2019–present) TV Series as Aneta "Anet" Sevastou
"4xxx4" (2016-2017) TV Series as Parthenia Ralli
"Orkos Siopis" (2014-2015) TV Series as Alexandra Aslani
"To Spiti tis Emmas" (2013-2014) TV Series as Ioulia Paxinou
"Dancing With The Stars (2012-2015) Judge
"Vals me Dodeka Theous" (2012-2014) TV Series 
"I Zoi tis Allis" (2009-2012) TV Series as Katia Kallifatidi
"Vera Sto Dexi" (2004–2007) TV Series as Claire
"Leni" (2003) TV Series as Eleni
"Istera irthan oi melisses" (2000) TV Series as Despina
"Lampsi, I" (1991–1998) TV Series as Virna Drakou
Sweet Country (1987) as Sister Mathilde
"A.D." (1985) (mini) TV Series as Octavia
Tragoudi tis epistrofis, To (1983)
"Athlioi ton Athinon, Oi" (1980) TV Series as Mariora
"Pantheoi, Oi" (1977) TV Series as Marmo Pantheou
1000 hronia prin (1977) (TV)
Agnostos stratiotis (1976) as Myrto
Sta dyktia tou tromou (1975)
Daimonismeni, I (1975) as Eleni Stavrianou
Gios mou, o Stefanos, O (1975) as Hristina
"O Hristos xanastavronetai " (1975) TV Series as Maryori
"O Asterismos ton likon " (1974) TV Series
"Alithines istories" (1974) TV Series
Epikindini nychta (1974)
Lesviakos Avgoustos (1974) as Angeliki
Okei, file (1974)
Sfalma (1974)
Polemistai tis eirinis (1973)
Sta diktia tis arahnis (1973)
Boom, tara!!! Ta tzoum!!! (1972) as Lefkippi
Ippokratis kai dimokratia (1972)
Os tin teleftaia stygmi (1972)
Souliotes (1972)
Olokaftoma, To (1971)
Megali stigmi tou '21: Papaflessas, I (1971)

References
https://www.webcitation.org/query?url=http://www.geocities.com/katia4ever/katia_bio2.html&date=2009-10-26+01:13:49
https://www.webcitation.org/query?url=http://www.geocities.com/katia4ever/katia_theatre2.html&date=2009-10-26+01:13:54

External links

https://web.archive.org/web/20091027000022/http://geocities.com/katia4ever/

1948 births
Living people
Greek television actresses
Greek film actresses
Greek stage actresses
Greek television presenters
Actors from Thessaloniki
Greek female models
20th-century Greek actresses
21st-century Greek actresses
Greek women television presenters